Hugh Jones is a fictional character appearing in American comic books published by Marvel Comics.

The character appeared in the Marvel Cinematic Universe live-action series Agent Carter, portrayed by Ray Wise.

Publication history
Hugh Jones first appeared in Captain America #180 (Dec. 1974), and was created by Steve Englehart and Sal Buscema.

Fictional character biography
Hugh Jones was the son of a Texas oil millionaire and inherited the company Republic Oil & Gas after his father’s death.

With Jones's awareness and approval, Republic Oil & Gas' executives (John T. Gamelin, Jonas Hale and Simon Krieger) arranged the murders of Howard Stark and Maria Stark in order to achieve an attempted takeover of Stark Industries, using surreptitious purchases of stock and the use of superhuman agents (Saboteur and the Dogs of War). However, Iron Man foiled these various attempts and Republic Oil & Gas' executives oversaw the company's change of identity to Roxxon Oil to help separate the company's bad publicity.

An ex-lover of Jones tried to shoot him, but either missed or wounded him.

Jones later attended the premiere of the Captain America movie at the Strand Theatre in New York. Jones was kidnapped by the Serpent Squad (consisting of Viper, Eel, Cobra, and Princess Python). The rebel Atlantean Warlord Krang had recovered and delivered the Serpent Crown to Viper. Jones immediately fell under the mental control of Set as he instructs all Roxxon workers to cooperate with any demands. The Serpent Squad then took Jones to a central Pacific Ocean oil derrick where Jones followed Krang's instructions to pump water underneath the sunken city of Lemuria in an attempt to raise the city. The police, along with Nomad and Namor the Sub-Mariner, interrupted the Serpent Squad's plan, however, and Krang reclaimed the Serpent Crown and fled. Jones then reversed the process that was to raise Lemuria.

Jones voluntarily maintained a link to Set in the Serpent Crown's absence. Set informs Jones of Nomad's identity. Jones then sent men to recover the Serpent Crown. Jones later sent a message about the Red Skull's location that this paid his debt of Nomad rescuing him from Warlord Krang and the Serpent Squad. Once he recovered it, he began wearing it invisibly.

With the power of Set, he was able to make psychic contact with a group of businessmen called the Serpent Cartel, acolytes of Set from the alternate universe Earth-S. This Earth is where the Squadron Supreme superhero group resides, and that universe's version of the Serpent Crown has managed to gain control of the minds of many of the leaders of America's largest corporations and even that alternate America's President Nelson Rockefeller.

Following Roxxon's purchase of the Brand Corporation, Jones was at Brand Corporation's facility in Jamaica, Queens. When the Avengers broke into Brand Corporation's facility during their investigation, Jones used an interdimensional transporter to bring the Squadron Supreme to his Earth and captured the Avengers. When the Avengers escaped, the superhero team and the Squadron Supreme were sent back to Earth-S with the interdimensional transporter when the police came to investigate. After deceiving and dismissing the police investigators, Jones used the Serpent's Crown to speak to Rockefeller. When the Avengers again invaded the Brand Corporation facility, Rockefeller informed Jones that the Avengers have overthrown him. Jones sent Orka against the Avengers and defeated some of the Avengers until Orka was defeated by Thor and Moondragon. Jones ordered the other Avengers' execution but the group escaped and Jones was captured.

Using the Brand Corporation's and Roxxon Energy Corporation's facilities, Jones fashioned his own superpowered serpent for a Serpent Squad to retrieve a second Serpent's Crown which the Avengers brought back from Earth-S and dropped into the Pacific Ocean. Jones was given the Serpent's Crown of Earth-S by Sidewinder (who retrieved Serpent's Crown upon being hired by Jones). Upon wearing both Serpent Crowns, Jones gained a scaly appearance and used these powers to assume complete control over the residents of Washington DC for the purpose of putting them under Set's control. Jones allowed the Thing, Stingray and Scarlet Witch to enter unopposed so that he can control the mutants and then created versions of the Serpent Crown's recent previous wearers to fight the threesome. While simultaneously fighting Scarlet Witch and Thing physically, Jones was surprised when Scarlet Witch capitulated and Thing took advantage of Jones's memory disorientation to wrench the Serpent Crown from Jones's head.

Following his traumatic separation from the Serpent Crown, Jones was driven insane and was hospitalized in a mental hospital. He was succeeded as Roxxon's president by other men over the years.

In other media
Hugh Jones appears in the Agent Carter live-action television series, portrayed by Ray Wise. This version is depicted as the President of the Roxxon Oil Corporation in the 1940s. Introduced in season one, he was Howard Stark's former friend until the woman that would become his wife came between the two. In the episode "Bridge and Tunnel", Jones is visited by Deputy Director Roger Dooley, Agent Jack Thompson, and Peggy Carter of the Strategic Scientific Reserve to discuss important information. In season two, Jones appears as a member of the Council of Nine. In the episode "A View in the Dark", Jones and Thomas Gloucester tell Calvin Chadwick to shut down the Isodyne Program and focus on a senatorial campaign. In the episode "The Atomic Job", Peggy encounters Jones while she is posing as a worker to infiltrate Roxxon's Los Angeles branch. He recalls Peggy, forcing her to use a memory inhibitor to knock out him so she can retrieve a key to a Roxxon facility. In the episode "Life of the Party", Jones attends a party with other Council of Nine members. When Whitney Frost is brought before them, they witness her absorption abilities as she takes over, with Jones being among those she spares.

References

External links
 Hugh Jones at Marvel Wiki
 Hugh Jones at Comic Vine
 

Characters created by Sal Buscema
Characters created by Steve Englehart
Fictional businesspeople
Marvel Comics supervillains